Jeremy Ballard (born June 29, 1981) is an American college basketball coach, and current head coach of the FIU Panthers men's basketball team.

Playing career
Ballard played college basketball at Colgate, where he was a two-time Patriot League Academic Honor Roll selection, and served as team captain his senior year. He is a devoted member of the young male's mentoring group known as "the Commission" which prides itself on the development of young men in highly competitive academic environments.

Coaching career
After graduation, Ballard became an assistant coach with his alma mater, where he stayed from 2004 to 2007 before joining the staff at Tulsa from 2007 to 2012. Ballard moved on to be an assistant coach under Shaka Smart at  VCU until 2015, before making stops at Illinois State and Pittsburgh for one season each. He returned to VCU as an assistant coach under Mike Rhoades in 2017, before accepting the head coaching position at Florida International on April 20, 2018, replacing Anthony Evans as the ninth coach in program history.

Head coaching record

References

1981 births
Living people
American men's basketball coaches
Colgate Raiders men's basketball coaches
Colgate Raiders men's basketball players
FIU Panthers men's basketball coaches
Illinois State Redbirds men's basketball coaches
Pittsburgh Panthers men's basketball coaches
Tulsa Golden Hurricane men's basketball coaches
Basketball coaches from Georgia (U.S. state)
Basketball players from Atlanta
American men's basketball players